John Madsen (born 14 May 1937-2021) is a Danish former footballer who played for Esbjerg fB, Greenock Morton, Hibernian, Newcastle United and Denmark.

References

External links 
John Madsen, www.ihibs.co.uk
John Madsen, Neil Brown

1937 births
Living people
People from Esbjerg
Association football central defenders
Danish men's footballers
Esbjerg fB players
Greenock Morton F.C. players
Hibernian F.C. players
Denmark international footballers
Danish expatriate men's footballers
Expatriate footballers in Scotland
Scottish Football League players
Sportspeople from the Region of Southern Denmark